Chipspeech is a vocal synthesizer software which was created by Plogue with the goal of recreating 1980s synthesizers.

About
The software is used for creating vocals for use within music. Chipspeech is designed to produce vintage-style vocals from synthesizers that were used by the music industry in the 1980s, having a cut off date of 1989 technology. The vocals, therefore, are not meant to sound realistic and are more suited for sound experimentation. It works as a text-to-speech method. Users type the lyrics in and receive instant playback results which was a capability beyond the original soundchips the software vocals are based on. The software is as simple as Vocaloid.  Though English and Japanese come as standard, other languages can be created by direct entry of syllables.  Though human-like vocals can be achieved, the results are always machine-like rather than man-like. It is capable of different synthesis methods or re-samplers. In addition for 1.032 version of the software a new "Speak and Spell" program was added creating the circuit bending feature.

Chipspeech itself as created as a result of research for Chipsounds by Plogue in the 2000s.   David Viens himself would often collect sound chips even if there was no need for them.  This obsession eventually lead to further events which resulted in the creation of the Chipspeech software after he spent years hacking, protoboard making, probing, and reverse engineering the speech chips.  He noted that the software's main goal was to be a singing emulator and not a text-to-speech software.  The source data of each vocal is 8 kHz or 10 kHz.  Despite all their effort, the project came to a halt. Hubert Lamontagne joined Plogue with knowledge of phonetics and digital signal processing, Hubert took interest in creating a vintage-sounding synthesizer, and designed the synthesizer to work beyond being a sound library.

It originally came with 7 "characters" upon purchase, more vocals have been added since and continue to be added. These characters come with their own backstory and are based on a sound synthesizer.  Recreation of these voices was done with permission from their respective license holders.  Plogue itself gained rights to the speech data from three TI-99/4A games (Alpiner, Parsec and Moon Mine), and the internal vocabulary of the TI Speech Device.  The process of gaining right for the vocals took over 10 years, as the company did not want to disrespect the copyright holders even when met with issues such as the license holder having gone bankrupt.  And while the technology was easy to emulate, the data needed for the emulation was not.

In January 2016, Plogue announced that Hubert Lamontagne had found a way to improve quality.  On 9 February,  Version 1.066 was released.  This fixed bugs with Deeklatt and Otto Mozer.  Voice improvements to Dandy 704 and Bert Gotrax were scheduled for the next release and were updated in 1.072.  Some vocals such as Dandy 704 are restricted by how far they can be improved.  In addition, Chipspeech will be receiving the ability to talk as well as sing in its next major update.  Chipspeech also was exported to Japan during June 2016.

Version 1.5 was released on 16 September 2016 adding talk capabilities, a growl adjustment and two new vocals "Rotten.ST" and "CiderTalk'84" based on the 16 bite era vocals.

In 2017 the Voder and Software Automatic Mouth were announced to be coming to the software in 2017.

Official Albums
An official album was created featuring the software.  The album is titled "
chipspeech AUTOMATE SONGS .01" and includes a cover of the song Stakker Humanoid using Otto Mozer, whose vocal is an emulation of the same synthesizer used for the samples taken from the arcade game Berzerk.

Characters
The vocals are split between a number of characters, in addition, Daisy from Alter/Ego could be imported into the software;
Bert Gotrax: This is a vocal based on the Votrax SC-01 device. Bert Gotrax is one mischievous little brat. Like a post-modern Pinocchio story gone wrong, he has escaped from his creator's workshop before the execution of a patch to fix his foul mouth. He now roams in the streets and back alleys, a skilled parkour athlete and wanted graffiti artist.
Lady Parsec: She is based on the TI-99/4A plug-in speech synthesizer module. Lady Parsec also has an HD vocal called, Lady Parsec HD. Lady Parsec is the omnipotent mother-of-all space traffic controllers, she's the Benevolent Dictator of Her own matriarchal galactic queendom. Her soothing voice can be heard anywhere at Her will in any of Her spacecraft. She's watching over you and She'll direct you with a hint of witty sarcasm.  She has two vocals compared to the other characters; "Lady Parsec" and "Lady Parsec HD".
Otto Mozer: Based on the TSI S14001A.Otto Mozer is a mad scientist and has roboticized himself in order to achieve his plans for world domination. He moves around in his levitating exopod. Since his face is permanently connected to a breathing apparatus, he has built himself a voice generator to communicate. He left out all vocal intonations, since he deemed them to be unnecessary to his purposes.
Dandy 704: based on the IBM 704 computer. Dandy 704 is a 19th-century gentleman who decided to escape death by having his brain mummified and transferred to an internal vat. His body is steam-powered and entirely mechanical except for his voice box (which is in dire need of a repair). He is a world class explorer, brash, charismatic and loud-mouthed. He's also an incredible romantic womanizer and will offer to marry anyone (despite his lack of a space carriage). Do not believe his fantastic stories. They are not true. The real ones are much crazier (and would incriminate him).
Dee Klatt: Based on Dectalk. Dee Klatt is a wise and mild-mannered android. Long ago, they were unjustly accused and hunted across the galaxy, and became a master in disguise out of necessity, changing into a child, a woman, a young or an old man. Nobody now remembers their true form.
Spencer AL2: Based on the SP0256-AL2 chip. Spencer AL2 is a self-aware pure AI. He creates his appearance and voice by channeling and bending energy as waves. Be careful! If you upset him, his anger has the power of an EMP bomb.
Terminal 99: also based on the TI-99/4A plug-in speech synthesizer module. Terminal 99 is an extremely old TI 99/4A computer, decked out with tons of mysterious extra hardware expansions including the famous TI voice module internally retrofitted, buzzing and whirling. It runs a chat program that was developed to win a Turing test contest. The terminal easily won, but the team who developed the chat program and the jury who tested it have gone completely insane and now worship Terminal 99 like a god. Legend has it that the computer has absorbed their souls...
VOSIM: based on a Standard DAC. He was the additional 8th vocal that was released on May 27, 2015. VOSIM was an early prototype sociable android companion. The project was scrapped because his voice was not intelligible enough. He spent many years wandering the electronic wastelands alone, until the day he decided he could try to be someone, get friends, and not let his weaknesses deter his desire to sing.
CiderTalk'84: Based on the original MacInTalk 1.0. Dr. CiderTalk'84 is no ordinary doctor... while normal doctors have a PhD in medicine, economics, physics or other similar fields, CiderTalk has a PhD in everything. He does know everything, and will constantly remind you of it. Every time something goes well, rest assured he will make sure you know that it was because of him. While everybody agrees that he is a genius, nobody can cite an example of something that CiderTalk actually did. Long lasting rumors explaining his powerful charisma would entail secret nano tech that invades everyone (and everything) around him.
Rotten.ST:  based on Atari ST's STSPEECH.TOS.  Rotten.ST has been in and out of British prisons since starting the cyberpunk movement in the early 1980s. Although nobody really knows exactly what he was arrested for, we can only imagine it was for good reasons. Rotten.ST has a pathological relationship with any form of authority, justice, law or order. You can be sure you will find him there loudly decrying the system, clamoring against police brutality, trying to start a riot (often succeeding). He is always be the first one in the paddy wagon. When things get rough, his signature blunt weapon is a large microphone stand, which he will gladly swing towards anyone in uniform. His intentionally buzzy and electronic voice and his looks -which consists in showing off as much electronic parts as possible- are all about subverting social norms.
SAM: Based on Software Automatic Mouth's synthesizer technology.
Voder: Based on the Bell Labs Voder.

Reception
Reception to the software was mostly positive.  It won 3 Computer Music awards; Editor's Choice, Performance and Innovation.  The software was described as a polished product at their MusicRadar review and noted as "tons of fun to use".

AskAudio in their "Voice of the Machines" review focused on the fact that with the raise of Autotuning software, a human is always required.  Chipspeech allowed a nostalgic approach to vocal synthesizing with its resulting vocals coming purely from a computer.  It listed the positives of the software as " Incredibly unique, fairly easy to use, sounds excellent, affordable" but noted as its main weakness was how the software strained the CPU.

CDM, who had been given exclusive early access to the software, also highlighted how "boring" modern synthesizers had become and focused on the "fun" that the software provided.  One of its highlighted merits of the software was how rare some historical chips it aimed to recreate had become.

In August 2016, Chipspeech topped the virtual instrument top 25 rankings at Sonicwire, owned by Crypton Future Media, beating their Vocaloids products such as Hatsune Miku which normally dominated their rankings.

Further reading
Chipspeech Diary part 1
Chipspeech Diary part 2

References

External links

Electronic musical instruments
Singing software synthesizers